Sir William Walter Carlile, 1st Baronet, OBE, DL, JP (15 June 1862 – 3 January 1950) was a British Conservative Party politician from Gayhurst in Buckinghamshire who served from 1895 to 1906 as the Member of Parliament (MP) for the Buckingham or (Northern) division of Buckinghamshire.

Biography 
Carlile was the only son of James Walter Carlile of Ponsbourne Park in Hertfordshire and his wife Mary (née Whiteman) from Glengarr in Argyll. He was educated at Harrow and at Clare College, Cambridge, and later became a lieutenant of the 3rd Volunteer Battalion of the Oxfordshire Light Infantry (the former Royal Buckinghamshire Militia (King's Own)).

He held several offices in the county: as a justice of the peace, a deputy lieutenant (having been appointed in 1897), and an Alderman of Buckinghamshire County Council. In early 1900 he received a commission as major of the 1st Battalion, Buckinghamshire Rifle Volunteers.

Carlile first stood for Parliament at the 1892 general election, when he was defeated in Buckingham by the sitting Liberal Party MP Herbert Samuel Leon. He won the seat at the next election, in 1895, on a swing of 4.5%, and was re-elected in 1900. He stood down from the House of Commons at the 1906 general election, when Buckingham was won by the Liberal Frederick William Verney.

Honours 
Having been appointed an Officer of the Order of the British Empire (OBE) in 1918, Carlile was made a baronet, of Gayhurst in the County of Buckingham, in the 1928 Birthday Honours. The baronetcy became extinct on his death.

Personal 
In 1885, Carlile married Blanche Anne Cadogan, daughter of the Rev. Edward Cadogan of Wicken, Northamptonshire.

His residence was listed in 1901 as Gayhurst House in Newport Pagnell, Buckinghamshire, a late-Elizabethan stone mansion house formerly owned by Everard Digby, one of the conspirators in the Gunpowder Plot of 1605.

References

External links 
 

1862 births
1950 deaths
Conservative Party (UK) MPs for English constituencies
UK MPs 1895–1900
UK MPs 1900–1906
People educated at Harrow School
Alumni of Clare College, Cambridge
Deputy Lieutenants of Buckinghamshire
Councillors in Buckinghamshire
Members of Buckinghamshire County Council
Baronets in the Baronetage of the United Kingdom
Officers of the Order of the British Empire
People from Newport Pagnell
Oxfordshire and Buckinghamshire Light Infantry officers